Abura-Dunkwa is a small town and the capital of Abura-Asebu-Kwamankese District, a district in the Central Region of south Ghana.

Geography

Topography
Abura-Dunkwa is low-lying with loose quaternary sands and it rises up to 80 metres above sea level. The town is drained by a number of rivers and streams, including the Offin River, Birim River and small streams.

Education
Abura-Dunkwa is known for the Aburaman Senior High Sch, and Samtet Oxford Snr High School.

Transport 
Abura-Dunkwa is a junction station on the narrow gauge Ghana Railway system.

References 

Populated places in the Central Region (Ghana)